Gulbrandsen is a Norwegian language surname, meaning "son of Gulbrand". Notable people with the surname include:

Aase Gulbrandsen (1927–2020), Norwegian artist
Andreas Gulbrandsen (1906–1989), Norwegian chess player
Bjørn Gulbrandsen (1927–1988), Norwegian ice hockey player
Bjørn Oscar Gulbrandsen (1925–2011), Norwegian ice hockey player and yacht racer
Christine Gulbrandsen (born 1985), singer and Norwegian entrant in the 2006 Eurovision Song Contest
Fredrik Gulbrandsen (born 1992), Norwegian footballer
Håkon Gulbrandsen (born 1969), Norwegian diplomat and politician for the Socialist Left Party
Hans Martin Gulbrandsen (1914–1979), Norwegian sprint canoeist
Ingrid Gulbrandsen (1899–1975), Norwegian figure skater
Jan Gulbrandsen (1938–2007), Norwegian hurdler and sports official
Kate Gulbrandsen (born 1965), Norwegian singer
Niclas Gulbrandsen (1930–2013), Norwegian printmaker
Parley Gulbrandsen (born 1889), Norwegian missionary to China with the Norwegian Evangelical Mission
Per Gulbrandsen (1897–1963), Norwegian rower who competed in the 1920 Summer Olympics
Ragnhild Gulbrandsen (born 1977), retired Norwegian football striker from Trondheim
Solveig Gulbrandsen (born 1981), Norwegian footballer from Oslo
Thor-Eirik Gulbrandsen (born 1940), Norwegian politician for the Labour Party

See also
Gulbrandsen Lake 0.5 miles (0.8 km) long lying north of Neumayer Glacier in South Georgia
Gulbransen
Guldbrandsen

References

Norwegian-language surnames